DSFL may refer to:

 DIY Space for London, creative hub and music venue
 Driving Skills for Life, a program of the Ford Motor Company